Robert J. Castelli (born December 16, 1949) is an American security consultant, professor and media personality from Goldens Bridge, New York. He served two terms as a member of the New York State Assembly, representing northeastern Westchester County, New York.

During the Vietnam War, he served with the 7th Cavalry Regiment in the United States Army. Upon his separation from military, he became a member of the New York State Police, where he served with the elite Special Investigations Unit and the New York State Organized Crime Task Force for over two decades.

A graduate of Harvard University, Castelli became an educator in 1996 went on to serve as Chair of the Criminal Justice Department at Iona College. After holding elective office in local government, Castelli ran for and was elected to the State Assembly in a special election in February 2010, and was reelected just eight months later for a second, and this time full two-year term. He is also a columnist for the website Politico.

Early life and military career

Castelli was born in Jamaica, New York. He dropped out of high school in 1967 and volunteered to join the United States Army, and was assigned to the 1st Air Cavalry Division as an infantryman. He served in combat operations in the Republic of Vietnam from 1968 to 1969. He received an honorable discharge in 1973.

Upon his return from his Army service, he worked as a Constable in South Carolina before returning to New York and beginning a 21-year career in the New York State Police, during which he worked as an intelligence officer with elite Special Investigations Unit and the New York State Organized Crime Task Force. Castelli held the ranks of trooper, sergeant, investigator, and eventually was promoted to station commander. He was involved in numerous high-profile arrests during his tenure with the State Police.

Castelli is a graduate of Palmer College, the State University of New York and Harvard Kennedy School at Harvard University, where he was named a Pickett Fellow in Criminal Justice Policy and Management by the National Institute of Justice in recognition of his contributions to the law enforcement community. He was also once a nationally ranked competitive  sport shooter.

After retiring from the State Police he began a career as an educator, teaching at Iona College for thirteen years and rising to become Chairman of the Criminal Justice Department. He also worked as an adjunct professor at CUNY John Jay College of Criminal Justice and Marist College from 1996 to 2010, where he lectured on a wide variety of criminal justice and security-related subjects including criminal investigation, organized crime, white collar crime, terrorism, security management and police procedures.

These credentials made him a popular guest as an expert commentator in print, radio, and television media programs throughout the United States. Prior to his transition from public service to politics, Castelli was a regular contributor on network television including ABC, CBS, Fox News, CNN, MSNBC and Court TV. Castelli also owns a professional security consulting business, holding certifications as a Certified Fraud Examiner, Crime Prevention Specialist, Certified Criminal Analyst, Certified Protection Professional, Certified Police and Security Officer Instructor, Certified Firearms Instructor and licensed and bonded Private Investigator.

Castelli, who calls himself a public servant, resides in the Goldens Bridge hamlet of Lewisboro, New York. He has two sons, one of whom is a Lieutenant Colonel in the United States Army Special Forces and also a graduate of Harvard Kennedy School, and another who is an ordained Minister, serving a congregation in southern Florida.

Political career

A Republican, Castelli was elected as a town councilman in his home town of Lewisboro from 2000 to 2004. He made his first run for the State Assembly in 2004.

From February 2010 to January 2013, he represented Westchester County in the New York State Legislature, which includes the towns of Bedford, Harrison, Lewisboro, Mount Kisco, New Castle, North Castle, Pound Ridge and portions of the City of White Plains in Westchester County, New York. He writes for Politico's Arena, a daily, cross-party and cross-discipline medium which the newspaper calls its "daily debate with policy makers and opinion shapers."

As Castelli counted New York State's Governor Andrew Cuomo amongst his constituents, he was generally portrayed as being closely aligned with the Governor, thus furthering the image of bipartisanship and reputation for working across the aisle he sought to cast.

2010 special election
He was elected to the New York State Assembly in a special election on February 9, 2010, defeating County Legislator Peter Harckham in an upset victory. The previous incumbent, Democratic Assemblyman Adam Bradley, had resigned after he was elected Mayor of White Plains in 2009. Castelli previously ran for the seat in 2004, but was defeated by Bradley.

Political prognosticators viewed the suburban contest as a sign of a Republican resurgence and a barometer for coming fall elections, where Republicans would eventually go on to make large gains in the United States Senate, House of Representatives, and retake the New York State Senate. Castelli described his victory as "an expression of voter discontent with the state capitol" and the corruption prevalent in New York's State Government.

2010 general election
After serving for only eight months, the freshman legislator had to run for a full term. In the 2010 general election, Castelli held the seat by defeating White Plains City Council President Thomas Roach. Winning with a slim 112 vote margin, a month-long recount was necessary before Castelli could be declared the winner, thus earning him a full two-year term representing the 89th District. The 89th Assembly District has over 10,000 more registered Democrats than Republicans, and Castelli is the first Republican to hold the seat in seventeen years.

His 2010 election and subsequent reelection are considered significant, as the 89th Assembly District seat to which he was elected is gerrymandered to be a Democratic district, and happens to be the home of prominent Democratic political figures including former U.S. President Bill Clinton, Secretary of State Hillary Clinton, Governor of New York Andrew Cuomo, attorney Robert F. Kennedy, Jr. and George Soros, billionaire financier of numerous progressive causes. Castelli was also outspent by his opponents, although he attempted to overcome these disadvantages by running what he called a "grassroots, front-porch campaign."

2012 general election
As a Republican representing a heavily Democratic district, Castelli placed a large emphasis on bipartisanship. He decried the 2012 redistricting process as partisan gerrymandering, for which he was named a "Hero of Reform" by former New York City Mayor Ed Koch. Castelli voted against the final redistricting bill, which further gerrymandered and renumbered his district from the 89th to the 93rd Assembly District, added the town of North Salem, and significantly reoriented the portion of the City of White Plains contained within the district, which packed more Democratic-leaning voters into the already heavily Democratic district which Castelli, a member of the Republican Party, represented.

Castelli sought to earn a reputation as a reformer, and frequently challenged Albany's infamous "dysfunction" in his campaign rhetoric. The press frequently said he is known for his independence from both parties. In an editorial endorsing Castelli, The New York Times called him "the kind out outsider Albany needs."

Sensing political opportunity following the redistricting process, White Plains City Councilman David Buchwald launched a challenge to Castelli, citing the district's overwhelming Democratic enrollment advantage. Castelli received endorsements from every newspaper in the district and aired television and radio ads featuring Democratic Governor Andrew Cuomo saying, "Assemblyman Castelli, I'll tell you how tough Assemblyman Castelli's job is. He is MY Assemblyman ... He's doing a great job representing me and this entire district."

Despite running a spirited campaign where he was again outspent, Castelli could not overcome party-line voting in the high turnout for incumbent President Barack Obama, although he still managed to garner 47% of the vote in the overwhelmingly Democratic district.

Political positions
 Castelli was known as a staunch fiscal conservative and held strong pro-business, anti-tax and limited government positions. Yet he also held environmentalist views considered atypical for most Republican politicians, and his pro-conservation ideals garnered him support and endorsements from organizations such as the League of Conservation Voters and Sierra Club during all of his campaigns. For instance, he was a cosponsor and vocal proponent of a ban on hydraulic fracturing in the Marcellus Shale region of upstate New York, a process for natural gas exploration which is known as "hydro-fracking."

He received a perfect score on the environment from the statewide group EPL/Environmental Advocates in 2011 and 2012, on the only scorecard that grades New York State lawmakers according to their votes on the environment. His score led all Republican lawmakers in both houses in each of his three years in office.

A self-described conservationist, Castelli also received top marks from the New York State Rifle and Pistol Association for what they described as "his actions in defense of our civil rights," as well as from the New York State Farm Bureau, which named him to their prestigious "Circle of Friends."

According to Patch Media, a regional outlet covering the 89th Assembly District, he "earned a reputation for being an independent voice in the Legislature, especially on tax policies that he says unfairly penalize Westchester County residents and business owners."

As one of only three combat veterans in the State Assembly, he placed a large part of his legislative focus on veterans' issues. He was credited with building the coalition that saved the five New York State Veterans Homes from elimination  in the 2011 New York State budget. The homes are disabled veteran and veterans gerontological elder-care facilities, which were facing steep budget cuts and potential closure of one or more of the facilities, until the cuts were averted due to efforts from twenty-seven State lawmakers.

Castelli also introduced legislation to prevent the Federal government from spinning off the Franklin Delano Roosevelt Campus of the VA at Montrose to private developers, by requiring the State to step in and seize the property via grant, purchase, or eminent domain, in order that it be forever used for veteran's purposes.

Legislative achievements
In his first 120 days in office, Castelli passed two pieces of legislation, the first of which was signed into law by Governor David A. Paterson as Chapter 294 of the Laws of 2010. Castelli showed an uncanny ability to pass his own prime-sponsored legislation despite being a member of the Assembly's minority, which has a reputation for legislative powerlessness amid the control of Assembly Speaker Sheldon Silver.

In 2011, Castelli became the first member of the Minority since 2007 to pass a "statewide" bill, a veterans protection measure which prohibited public employers from abolishing positions of persons absent on military duty. Six other Castelli bills have been signed into law, making him one of the more productive junior lawmakers in Albany.

During the legislative session in 2012, Castelli authored and passed a bill to extend the statute of limitations for Vietnam Veterans to bring claims arising from exposure to Agent Orange and other phenoxy herbicides, which was signed into law by Governor Cuomo. He also cosponsored and passed a bill to increase funding for the state's Environmental Protection Fund (EPF), and conduct a health impact assessment of hydrofracking before the state considers whether or not to allow the controversial process to go forward.

Castelli also authored a bill to eliminate the Mount Kisco Urban Renewal Agency, a moribund public authority, which was called an "unnecessary mandate" for the village, that successfully passed both houses of the legislature in 2012. He also authored and passed legislation to rename portions of New York State Route 120 in Chappaqua and Purchase for Staff Sergeant Kyu Hyuk Chay, and Specialist Anthony Kalladeen, soldiers from those communities who were killed in action during the wars in Afghanistan, and Iraq, respectively.

Election results
 February 2010 special election, NYS Assembly, 89th AD
{| class="Wikitable"
| Robert J. Castelli (REP - IND - CON) ||...|| 6,966 (55.3%)
|-
| Peter B. Harckham (DEM - WOR) ||...|| 5,639 (44.7%)
|}

 November 2010 general election, NYS Assembly, 89th AD
{| class="Wikitable"
| Robert J. Castelli (REP - CON - TXP) ||...|| 21,263 (50.1%)
|-
| Thomas M. Roach, Jr. (DEM - IND - WOR) ||...|| 21,151 (49.9%)
|}

 November 2012 general election, NYS Assembly, 93rd AD
{| class="Wikitable"
| Robert J. Castelli (REP - CON) ||...|| 24,609 (47%)
|-
| David Buchwald (DEM - IND - WOR) ||...|| 29,394 (53%)
|}

References

Bibliography
Neubaer, David W. & Meinhold, Stephen S. Judicial Process: Law, Courts, and Politics in the United States. Fifth Ed. (Wadsworth Cengage Learning, New York 2009). .
Sifakis, Carl. The mafia encyclopedia. (Infobase Publishing, New York 2005). .
Schmalleger, Frank. Criminology today: an integrative introduction. (Prentice Hall,  New York 2002). .
White, Jonathan R. Terrorism and homeland security. Sixth Ed. (Wadsworth Cengage Learning, New York 2009). .

External links
 Robert J. Castelli campaign website
 Faculty Page at Iona University
 Robert Castelli's column for Politico

1949 births
Living people
American broadcast news analysts
American columnists
American conservationists
American intelligence analysts
United States Army personnel of the Vietnam War
American male sport shooters
American state police officers
City University of New York faculty
Empire State College alumni
Experts on terrorism
Iona College faculty
People from Jamaica, Queens
Harvard Kennedy School alumni
Marist College faculty
Republican Party members of the New York State Assembly
People from Lewisboro, New York
Private detectives and investigators
Terrorism theorists
United States Army soldiers
Politicians from Westchester County, New York
Activists from New York (state)
21st-century American politicians